Marylinka mimera is a species of moth of the family Tortricidae. It is found in Paraná, Brazil.

References

Moths described in 1983
Cochylini